The Vaishno Devi Temple also referred to as Shri Mata Vaishno Devi Temple and Vaishno Devi Bhavan is a prominent and widely revered Hindu temple dedicated to goddess Vaishno Devi. It is located in Katra, Reasi on the slopes of Trikuta Hills within the union territory of Jammu & Kashmir in India. The temple is recognized as one of the 108 Maha (major) Shakti Peethas dedicated to Durga, who is worshipped as Vaishno Devi. Having the principal aspect of Durga, hindus consider Vaishno Devi as an incarnation of Kali, Saraswati and Lakshmi. The temple is governed by the Shri Mata Vaishno Devi Shrine Board (SMVDSB), chaired by the Government of Jammu and Kashmir in August 1986.

It is one of the most visited pilgrimage centers of India. Every year, millions of devotees visit the temple. During festivals like Navaratri, the footfall increases to as high as one crore. It is also one of the richest temples in India with annual receipts of almost 16 billion dollars according to some authors.

The temple is sacred to both Hindus and Sikhs. Many prominent saints such as Guru Gobind Singh Ji and Swami Vivekananda have visited the temple.

The temple is governed by Shri Mata Vaishno Devi Shrine Board (SMVDSB). The board was established under the Jammu and Kashmir state government Act No. XVI/1988, also known as Shri Mata Vaishno devi Shrine Act. The board is chaired by the Lieutenant Governor of Jammu & Kashmir who also appoints 9 board members for governing the Shrine.

History
The temple, at a height of 1,584.96 m (5,200 ft), is  12 km from Katra on Trikuta hill. It is about 61 km from Jammu city.   A geological study of the Holy Cave has indicated its age to be nearly a million years. There is also a mention of the Trikuta hill in Rigveda, the place where the temple is located.

The Mahabharata, which gives the account of the Pandavas and the Kurukshetra War, does mention the worship of goddess Vaishno Devi. Before the Kurukshetra War Arjuna is said to have worshipped Devi by the advice of Lord Krishna for the blessings. Pleased by his devotion, Mother Goddess appeared in front of him in the form of Vaishno Devi. When goddess appeared, Arjuna started praising her with a stotra, in which a  Shloka goes by saying ‘ Jambookatak Chityaishu Nityam Sannihitalaye ’, which means ‘you who always dwell in the temple on the slope of the mountain in Jambhu’  probably referring to the present day Jammu. Former Governor of Jammu and Kashmir Jagmohan says, "the Mata Vaishno Devi shrine is an ancient one whose antiquity is pre-Mahabharathan, Lord Krishna is believed to have advised Arjuna to go up in the hills of 'Jambhu' and seek the blessings of Vaishno Devi before taking up arms in the battlefield. 'Jambhu' is identified with present-day Jammu. Arjuna while worshipping Vaishno Devi, calls Her, the highest Yogin who is free from decrepitude and decay, who is the Mother of the Vedas and the Science of Vedanta and who is giver of Victory and personification of victory itself". It is also generally believed that the Pandavas were the first to build the temples at Kol Kandoli and Bhawan in reverence and gratitude for the Mother Goddess. On a mountain, just adjacent to the Trikuta Mountain and overlooking the Holy Cave are five stone structures, which are believed to be the rock symbols of the five Pandavas.

The Appearance of Vaishno Devi to Shridhar and the story of Bhairon Nath

It is said that Bhairon Nath, a famous Hindu Tantric, saw the young Vaishno Devi at an agricultural fair and fell madly in love with her. Vaishno Devi fled into Trikuta hills to escape his amorous advances, later she assumed the form of Durga and cut off his head with her sword in a cave.

According to author Manohar Sajnani, Hindu mythology holds that the original abode of Vaishno Devi was Ardh Kunwari, a place about halfway between Katra town and the cave.

On 1 January 2022, 12 people were killed and 16 others injured during a stampede near to Gate No. 3 at the shrine.

Deities

The three idols  Mahakali, Mahalakshmi and Mahasaraswati, all images of Vaishno Devi are worshipped at the temple. The feet of the idols are washed by the water brought from the perennial flowing river Banganga.

Worship
Author Abha Chauhan identifies Vaishno Devi with the power of Durga as well as the incarnation of Lakshmi, Saraswati and Kali. Pintchman writes that Vaishno Devi possesses all the same powers as the supreme divinity Adi Shakti or simply Durga. Pintchman also states that most pilgrims identify Vaishno Devi as Durga, who is also called Sheranwali, "the Lion-rider".

Festivals
The most prominent festivals held at Vaishno Devi Temple are Navaratri, a  nine nights festival celebrating Devi's victory over evil demons and Diwali, a festival of lights symbolizing the victory of light over darkness, good over evil, and knowledge over ignorance.

The Navaratri festival is a festival celebrated during the month of Ashvin, which typically falls in the Gregorian months of September and October.  The festival lasts for nine nights (ten days); artists from all over the country perform during the function at Vaishno Devi darbar. Due to COVID-19 pandemic Shrine Board also started delivering Prasāda for the devotees who are unable to come to the temple by collaborating with Postal Department of India.

Devotees of all faiths and all schools of thought of Hinduism visit the Vaishno Devi Temple.

Administration and visit

The Vaishno Devi Temple was included in the Jammu and Kashmir Shri Mata Vaishno Devi Shrine Act No. XVI/1988 and also part of Article 26 of the Constitution of India. The board name is Shri Mata Vaishno devi Shrine Board. There are nine members in the board; all are nominated by the Government of Jammu and Kashmir, particularly by Governor of Jammu and Kashmir. The Governor of Jammu and Kashmir is the ex-officio chairman of the board. In 1991, Shri Mata Vaishno devi Shrine Board management also took the control of Shiv Khori, a famous Shiva temple.

Shrine Board have also constructed guest houses such as Vaishnavi Dham, Saraswati Dham, Kalika Dham, Niharika Yatri Niwas, Shakti Bhawan and Ashirwad Bhawan near the Railway station and Bus stand at Katra.

During the winter season from the month of December to January the Vaishno Devi Temple will be covered with snow. Even though temple will not be closed during these days, people visiting the temple are recommended to bring heavy woollens, wind-cheaters, caps and gloves, although the temple management provides free blankets during the climb.

References

Bibliography

External links

Hindu temples in Jammu and Kashmir
Katra, Jammu and Kashmir
20th-century Hindu temples
Hindu pilgrimage sites in India
Shakti temples
Hindu cave temples in India
Caves of Jammu and Kashmir